The 1946 Washington Senators of Major League Baseball won 76 games, lost 78, and finished in fourth place in the American League. The 46th edition of the franchise was managed by Ossie Bluege and played its home games at Griffith Stadium, where it drew 1,027,216 fans, fifth in the league and tenth-most among the 16 MLB clubs. It was the only time the franchise would exceed one million in home attendance in its 60 years in Washington. In addition, its fourth-place standing represented the highest, and last "first-division", finish for the team during its final 15 seasons in the U.S. capital.

Offseason
 Prior to 1946 season: Dick Weik was signed as an amateur free agent by the Senators.

Regular season

Season standings

Record vs. opponents

Notable transactions 
 April 12, 1946: Jug Thesenga was released by the Senators.
 June 15, 1946: Jeff Heath was traded by the Senators to the St. Louis Browns for Joe Grace and Al LaMacchia.

Roster

Player stats

Batting

Starters by position 
Note: Pos = Position; G = Games played; AB = At bats; H = Hits; Avg. = Batting average; HR = Home runs; RBI = Runs batted in

Other batters 
Note: G = Games played; AB = At bats; H = Hits; Avg. = Batting average; HR = Home runs; RBI = Runs batted in

Pitching

Starting pitchers 
Note: G = Games pitched; IP = Innings pitched; W = Wins; L = Losses; ERA = Earned run average; SO = Strikeouts

Other pitchers 
Note: G = Games pitched; IP = Innings pitched; W = Wins; L = Losses; ERA = Earned run average; SO = Strikeouts

Relief pitchers 
Note: G = Games pitched; W = Wins; L = Losses; SV = Saves; ERA = Earned run average; SO = Strikeouts

Farm system 

LEAGUE CHAMPIONS: Orlando

References

External links
1946 Washington Senators at Baseball-Reference
1946 Washington Senators team page at www.baseball-almanac.com

Minnesota Twins seasons
1946 in sports in Washington, D.C.
Washington Senators season